Ellis Ferreira and Rick Leach defeated Petr Pála and Pavel Vízner in the final, 6–7(6–8), 7–6(7–2), 6–4, 6–4 to win the doubles tennis title at the 2001 Touchtel ATP World Doubles Challenge Cup.

Donald Johnson and Piet Norval were the reigning champions, but only Johnson competed that year partnering Jared Palmer; they were defeated in the semifinals by Pála and Vízner.

Seeds
Champion seeds are indicated in bold text while text in italics indicates the round in which those seeds were eliminated.

Draw

Finals

Touchtel group
Standings are determined by: 1. number of wins; 2. number of matches; 3. in two-players-ties, head-to-head records; 4. in three-players-ties, percentage of sets won, or of games won; 5. steering-committee decision.

Bharti group
Standings are determined by: 1. number of wins; 2. number of matches; 3. in two-players-ties, head-to-head records; 4. in three-players-ties, percentage of sets won, or of games won; 5. steering-committee decision.

References
ATP Doubles Challenge Cup Draw

Doubles